The Gotham Stakes is an American Thoroughbred horse race  for three-year-old horses run in early March at Aqueduct Racetrack in Queens, New York.  A Grade III event with a current purse of US$300,000, it is set at a distance of 1 mile on the dirt. It is part of the Road to the Kentucky Derby.

History
The race is named for New York City, which has been nicknamed Gotham since an 1807 article by Washington Irving. The event was inaugurated in 1953 at Jamaica Racetrack but following the facility's closure was moved to Aqueduct Racetrack for the 1960 season. In 1958, the race was restricted to horses four years of age and older.

The Gotham Stakes is the final local prep to the Wood Memorial Stakes and an official prep race for the Kentucky Derby. The only Derby winner who competed in the Gotham was American Triple Crown champion Secretariat, who tied the track record when winning the race in 1973.  Easy Goer improved on this in 1989, setting a track record of 1:32.40 – one of the fastest times ever run in North America on the dirt.

Since its inception, the Gotham has been competed at various distances:
 1 mile : 1960–1976, 1978, 1980–2002, 2004–2005, 2018–present 
  miles (8.5 furlongs) : 1953–1959, 1977, 1979, 2006–2017
 1 mile, 70 yards : 1984, 2003

The race was run in two divisions in 1953, 1974, 1975, and 1983.

Records
Speed  record: 
 1:32.40 – Easy Goer (1989) (Stakes and track record at 1 mile)
 1:42.65 – I Want Revenge (2009) (at former distance of  miles)

Most wins by a jockey:
 3 – Jorge Velásquez (1969, 1978, 1980)
 3 – Ángel Cordero Jr. (1970, 1975, 1991)
 3 – Jacinto Vásquez (1976, 1979, 1986)
 3 – Richard Migliore (1985, 2003, 2005)
 3 – Mike E. Smith (1990, 1992, 1995)
 3 – Jose Lezcano (2008, 2022, 2023)

Most wins by a trainer:
 3 – Claude R. McGaughey III (1989, 1992, 2005)
 3 – Kiaran McLaughlin (2006, 2018, 2019)

Most wins by an owner:
 2 – Cornelius Vanderbilt Whitney (1954, 1956)
 2 – Claiborne Farm (1969, 1992)
 2 – Locust Hill Farm (1983, 1988)

Winners

† In 1992 there was a dead heat for first.

References

1953 establishments in New York City
Horse races in New York City
Aqueduct Racetrack
Flat horse races for three-year-olds
Triple Crown Prep Races
Graded stakes races in the United States
Recurring sporting events established in 1953
Grade 3 stakes races in the United States